Kevin McLean is a former Australian rules footballer who played in Tasmania from the late 1950s to about 1970 and represented the state in interstate matches. He was inducted into the Tasmanian Football Hall of Fame in 2005.

McLean played for North Launceston in the Northern Tasmanian Football Association (NTFA).

Honours and achievements
Team
 represented Tasmania at 1966 Carnival (Hobart)
NTFA Premiership
 North Launceston 1961, 1963

Individual
 NTFA Best & Fairest: 1962 (eq 2nd), 1963 (winner), 1967 (3rd), 1968 (2nd on countback), 1969 (2nd)
 club Best & Fairest: 1959 (joint winner), 1962 (winner), 1963 (2nd)

References

North Launceston Football Club players
Australian rules footballers from Tasmania
Tasmanian Football Hall of Fame inductees
Living people
Year of birth missing (living people)
North Launceston Football Club coaches